The Reverend George Fisher FRS FRAS (31 July 1794 – 14 March 1873) was a British Arctic scientist.

Early life
He was born in Sunbury, Middlesex, England, the son of surveyor James Fisher and his wife Henrietta. In 1808 he became a clerk in the Westminster Fire Insurance Company, at the age of 14. In 1817 he entered St Catharine's College, Cambridge.

Arctic astronomy
In 1818 Fisher was appointed as one of two astronomers for an Arctic expedition commanded by David Buchan. His ship, HMS Dorothea, was charged to sail northwards across the pole to the Bering Strait in the belief that the polar ice had retreated. Fisher was provided with instruments to make scientific observations for the determination of the Earth's shape. The Dorothea and consort Trent reached their rendezvous at northwest Spitsbergen and set sail northwards on 7 June 1818. They were soon trapped and drifting helplessly in the polar ice and, after freeing themselves, returned home on 30 August. That was the last time Royal Navy vessels attempted to sail across the polar sea. Fisher's scientific data was well received and presented before the Royal Society.

He was then recommended by the Royal Society to be the astronomer for Captain William Parry’s second attempt to find a north-west passage. Parry became the first to sail through Frozen Strait, and in late August it was decided to make winter quarters off southeast Melville Peninsula, at Winter Island. A portable observatory was set up ashore during the winter and numerous wide-ranging experiments were conducted. Among them were those of value to navigators in high latitudes, including comparative tests of compasses and numerous observations to determine refraction when stars were observed near the horizon in very cold weather. He also measured the velocity of sound, the contraction of a series of different metal bars at low temperatures, and the behaviours of various chemicals.

The following summer Parry pressed on to little avail and during the following winter of 1822–23 Fisher once more set up the portable observatory ashore and continued his experiments. In the summer of 1823 Parry abandoned hope of finding a navigable passage through Hudson Bay and returned home.

Chaplaincy
In January 1825 he was elected Fellow of the Royal Society and in 1827 Fellow of the Royal Astronomical Society. He was awarded the Arctic Medal 1818–55 in May 1857, the only chaplain to be so honoured.

Greenwich
Around 1834 Fisher married Elizabeth Alicia Woosnam; they had two daughters and a son. That year he also accepted the Headmastership of the Royal Hospital School at Greenwich where he supervised the planning and construction of an observatory, which continued under his guidance for 13 years. He retired in 1863 and died in Rugby, Warwickshire in 1873.

References
 Biography

Notes

1794 births
1873 deaths
People from Sunbury-on-Thames
Fellows of the Royal Society